James Edward "Scoop" Veltman (born March 8, 1966) is a Canadian former lacrosse player who played for the Toronto Rock, the Ontario Raiders, and the Buffalo Bandits in the National Lacrosse League. Veltman won three NLL championships with the Bandits and then five more with the Rock, where he was captain for ten seasons.

Veltman and Dallas Eliuk were inducted into the National Lacrosse League Hall of Fame in March, 2009.



NLL career
Veltman began his NLL career in 1992 with the Buffalo Bandits. He played 5 seasons with the Bandits, winning three NLL Championships. After the 1996 season, Veltman and his wife travelled to Uganda where they did volunteer work for 17 months.

In 1998, Veltman returned to the NLL, moving with Bandit head coach Les Bartley to the expansion Ontario Raiders, based in Hamilton, Ontario. A year later, the Ontario franchise move to Toronto, becoming the Toronto Rock, where Jim has won five more NLL Championships. Veltman was the captain of the Rock from 1999 until his retirement following the 2008 season.

Jim Veltman led the National Lacrosse League in loose balls in 14 out of the 16 seasons he played, earning him the nickname "Scoop". On February 5, 2006, Veltman reached a milestone as he "scooped" his 2000th career loose ball. He also set the single season record for loose balls with 226 in the 2006 season. Veltman scooped 14 loose balls on April 8, 2006, to break his own previous record of 207, set in 2003. The record stood until Geoff Snider scooped 244 in 2008. John Tavares, the NLL's all-time leading scorer, considers Veltman to be "the best teammate he ever had."

Veltman was the first recipient of the National Lacrosse League Sportsmanship Award in 2002, and was named league MVP in 2004. He was also the first recipient of the Toronto Rock's Les Bartley Award (not to be confused with the NLL's Les Bartley Award for coach of the year).

On September 11, 2007, the Toronto Rock announced that they had resigned Veltman to a five-year agreement. Veltman would remain captain of the Rock for one more season, after which he would retire from playing and join the Rock coaching staff. The announcement ended speculation that Veltman was considering retiring to take the vacant Colorado Mammoth head coach position, a position eventually taken by Bob McMahon.

On April 27, 2008, Veltman played his last career game, as the Rock lost 15-14 to the Philadelphia Wings. Veltman had one goal, four assists, and 17 loose balls.

On April 12, 2019, Veltman's jersey number 32 was retired by the Toronto Rock in a pregame ceremony.

Off the floor, Veltman is a physical education teacher at Agincourt Collegiate Institute.

Post-playing career 
Following his retirement, Veltman became an assistant coach for the Rock in the 2009 season, later serving as the defensive coordinator for the New England Black Wolves in 2016 and 2017. He also served as head coach for the Czech national team at the 2011 World Indoor Lacrosse Championships in Prague. He was named the second general manager in New York Riptide franchise history on July 10, 2020. Veltman was relieved of his duties as Riptide GM on January 9, 2023.

Canadian Lacrosse Association Career
1992 - Member of the Mann Cup winning Brampton Excelsiors
1993 - Member of the Mann Cup winning Brampton Excelsiors
1998 - Member of the Mann Cup winning Brampton Excelsiors
2003 - Member of the Mann Cup winning Victoria Shamrocks

International Lacrosse Career
2003 - Captain of Team Canada, winners of the World Indoor Lacrosse Championships

Statistics

NLL
Reference:

References

Awards

1966 births
National Lacrosse League All-Stars
Canadian lacrosse players
Living people
Lacrosse people from Ontario
Sportspeople from Brampton
Toronto Rock players
Buffalo Bandits players
National Lacrosse League major award winners